Friedrich Karl Ludwig, Duke of Schleswig-Holstein-Sonderburg-Beck (20 August 175724 April 1816) was the ninth and penultimate Duke of Schleswig-Holstein-Sonderburg-Beck. Friedrich Karl Ludwig was the son of Prince Karl Anton August of Schleswig-Holstein-Sonderburg-Beck and his wife Countess Charlotte of Dohna-Schlodien.

Life
Friedrich Karl Ludwig was born in Königsberg, Kingdom of Prussia. At the age of two he lost his father who dies from wounds he received in the battle of Kundersdorf. He joined the Prussian Army in 1777 upon the request of King Frederick the Great. By 1781 he was a staff officer in the Regiment von Schlieben and by 1787 he commanded a grenadier battalion based in Königsberg. He assisted in the suppression of the 1794 Kościuszko Uprising and was Governor of Kraków in 1795. He retired from Prussian service as a lieutenant general in 1797 and spent the rest of his life improving agriculture in Holstein. He died in Wellingsbüttel Manor, now part of Hamburg.

He was a recipient of the Order of the Elephant, Order of St. Alexander Nevsky, Order of the Red Eagle, and the Order of Saint Hubert.

Marriage and issue

Friedrich married Countess Friederike of Schlieben (28 February 1757 – 17 December 1827) on 8 March 1780 in Königsberg. At the time, the marriage was not looked upon favorably because the Schlieben family didn't belong to the circle of either reigning families or ancient noble families. Friedrich and Friederike had three children: 
 Princess Friederike of Schleswig-Holstein-Sonderburg-Beck (13 December 1780 – 19 January 1862) ⚭ 1800 Gottlob Samuel von Richthofen, Baron von Richthofen (1769–1808)
 Princess Luise of Schleswig-Holstein-Sonderburg-Beck (28 September 1783 – 24 November 1803) ⚭ 1803 Frederick Ferdinand, Duke of Anhalt-Köthen
 Friedrich Wilhelm, Duke of Schleswig-Holstein-Sonderburg-Glücksburg (4 January 1785 – 27 February 1831)

Friedrich was succeeded as duke by his son, Friedrich Wilhelm, Duke of Schleswig-Holstein-Sonderburg-Glücksburg.

Ancestry

References

1757 births
1816 deaths
Dukes of Schleswig-Holstein-Sonderburg-Beck
Military personnel from Königsberg
Nobility from Königsberg
Lieutenant generals of Prussia
Prussian people of the Kościuszko Uprising